The Beechwood Elementary School is a midsized, urban, public school located in the Beechview neighborhood of  Pittsburgh, Pennsylvania. The building was built in 1908. It was listed on the National Register of Historic Places in 1986. The school provides taxpayer funded preschool through 5th grade. Enrollment was 333 in 2018. The school is part of the Pittsburgh School District.

References

External links
 Pittsburgh Beechwood PreK-5

School buildings on the National Register of Historic Places in Pennsylvania
School buildings completed in 1908
Schools in Pittsburgh
Pittsburgh History & Landmarks Foundation Historic Landmarks
Tudor Revival architecture in Pennsylvania
National Register of Historic Places in Pittsburgh
1908 establishments in Pennsylvania